The FIDE World Chess Championship 2000 was held in New Delhi, India, and Tehran, Iran. The first six rounds were played in New Delhi between 27 November and 15 December 2000, and the final match in Tehran started on 20 December and ended on 24 December 2000. The top seeded Indian Grandmaster Viswanathan Anand won the championship.

Background
At the time of this championship, the World title was split. The newly crowned Classical World Champion, Vladimir Kramnik, did not participate, as well as the previous Classical Champion and world's highest-rated player, Garry Kasparov. Anatoly Karpov, the 1998 FIDE World Champion and No.11-rated player, also did not take part in the tournament as he was in the midst of filing a lawsuit against the organization. However, most other strongest players of the world took part, including the defending FIDE World Champion Alexander Khalifman and the 2000 World Cup winner Viswanathan Anand. The only other absentee from the top 25 was Ye Jiangchuan.

Participants
All players are Grandmasters unless indicated otherwise.

 , 2762
 , 2756
 , 2755
 , 2746
 , 2743
 , 2719
 , 2707
 , 2702
 , 2702
 , 2690
 , 2689
 , 2681
 , 2677
 , 2677
 , 2676
 , 2673
 , 2670
 , 2668
 , 2668
 , 2667
 , 2667
 , 2666
 , 2661
 , 2660
 , 2659
 , 2657
 , 2657
 , 2649
 , 2648
 , 2646
 , 2643
 , 2643
 , 2641
 , 2633
 , 2630
 , 2627
 , 2627
 , 2627
 , 2627
 , 2623
 , 2623
 , 2620
 , 2613
 , 2611
 , 2609
 , 2606
 , 2605
 , 2599
 , 2598
 , 2598
 , 2596
 , 2595
 , 2595
 , 2594
 , 2592
 , 2591
 , 2587
 , 2584
 , 2583
 , 2582
 , 2577
 , 2574
 , 2573
 , 2572
 , 2572
 , 2567
 , 2567
 , 2566
 , 2557
 , 2557
 , 2556
 , 2555
 , 2554
 , 2554
 , 2552
 , 2545
 , 2541
 , 2536
 , 2534
 , 2529
 , 2527
 , 2526
 , 2525
 , 2522
 , 2513, IM
 , 2510, IM
 , 2502
 , 2499
 , 2495
 , 2488, no title
 , 2485
 , 2485, IM
 , 2461, IM
 , 2454, IM
 , 2429, IM
 , 2426, IM
 , 2418, IM
 , 2409, IM
 , 2322, IM
 , 2257, no title

Qualification
Players qualified for the championship according to the following criteria:
four semi-finalists of the previous championship (Alexander Khalifman, Vladimir Akopian, Michael Adams, Liviu-Dieter Nisipeanu);
juniors rated 2600 or higher in the rating lists of January 2000 to July 2000;
the World Junior Champions 1999 (Aleksandr Galkin) and 2000 (Lázaro Bruzón);
the Women's World Champion 1999 (Xie Jun);
three nominees of the FIDE President;
one nominee of the organizers;
62 qualifiers from the zonal tournaments;
one nominee from each of the Continental Presidents (for a total of four players);
a sufficient number of best rated players, to bring the total number of participants to 100 (the average of January and July 2000 rating lists was used);

Playing conditions
The championship was a knockout tournament similar to other FIDE World Chess Championships between 1998 and 2004: the players were paired for short matches, with losers eliminated. 28 players (27 best rated and Liviu-Dieter Nisipeanu, one of the quarterfinalists of the previous championship) were given byes to the second round. The field of 100 participants was reduced to one winner over seven rounds.

Rounds 1–5 consisted of a two-game match, followed by tie breaks at faster time controls if required. The time control for regular games was 100 minutes, with 50 minutes added after move 40, 10 minutes added after move 60, and 30 seconds added after each move starting with move 1. Tie breaks consisted of two rapid chess games (25 minutes each + 10 seconds per move); followed by two games with shorter time controls if required (15 minutes + 10 seconds per move); followed by a series of blitz games (4 minutes + 10 seconds per move for White, 5 minutes + 10 seconds per move for Black, first player to win is the winner of the match). The semifinals (round 6) were best of four games, and the final was best of six games, with the same conditions for the tie-breaks.

Schedule
There was one rest day during round 4 and two rest days during round 6. The tie-breaks of rounds 1–5 were played in the evening following the second game. The final took place one month after rounds 1–6.

Round 1: 27 November 2000, 28 November 2000 (tiebreaks on 29 November 2000)
Round 2: 30 November 2000, 1 December 2000 (tiebreaks on 2 December 2000)
Round 3: 3 December 2000, 4 December 2000 (tiebreaks on 5 December 2000)
Round 4: 6 December 2000, 7 December 2000 (tiebreaks on 8 December 2000)
Round 5: 9 December 2000, 10 December 2000 (tiebreaks on 11 December 2000)
Round 6: 12 December 2000 – 15 December 2000 (tiebreaks on 16 December 2000)
Round 7: 20 December 2000 – 26 December 2000, with a rest day on 23 December 2000 (tiebreaks on 27 December 2000)

Results, rounds 1–4

Section 1

Section 2

Section 3

Section 4

Section 5

Section 6

Section 7

Section 8

Results, rounds 5–7

Championship final

The final match of the FIDE World Championship featured Viswanathan Anand, the pre-tournament favorite and No. 1 seed, and Alexei Shirov, who had previously been denied a chance to challenge Garry Kasparov for the Classical World Championship despite winning a candidates' match two years earlier. After an uneventful 34-move draw in Game 1, the two players exchanged pieces quickly in Game 2, leading to a relatively even rook-and-pawn endgame after 30 moves. But Shirov gave Anand an opening with 47... Ke5?, allowing the latter to preserve two passed pawns and turn them into a winning advantage. Anand would strike again in the third game – with Shirov on the attack, Anand held a strong defensive position until 27... Qg5! followed by 28. Qf3?! from Shirov gave him a solid advantage.

In the decisive Game 4, Shirov played a sharp attacking game, knowing a victory was required to stay in contention for the championship. But he faltered with 19... Qf6?, missing a sound queen sacrifice that would have led to an equal endgame with winning opportunities (19... Qxe2 20. Bxe2 Bf2 21. Rh1 e5) and followed with 20... Qxc3?, leaving his h-file bishop hanging. Anand was able to translate the resulting advantage into a winning position.

{| class="wikitable" style="text-align:center"
|+FIDE World Chess Championship Final 2000
|-
! !! Rating !! 1 !! 2 !! 3 !! 4 !! Points
|-
| align=left |  || 2746
| ½ ||style="background:black; color:white"| 0 || 0 ||style="background:black; color:white"| 0 || ½
|-
| align=left |  || 2774
|style="background:black; color:white"| ½ || 1 ||style="background:black; color:white"| 1 || 1 || 3½
|}

References

External links
World Chess Championship, 2000 FIDE Knockout Matches

2000 FIDE
2000 in chess
Chess
Chess
2000 in Indian sport
2000 in Iranian sport
2000s in Delhi
20th century in Tehran
Chess in India
Chess in Iran